William Austin Dillon (November 6, 1877 – February 10, 1966) was an American songwriter and Vaudevillian. He is best known as the lyricist for the song "I Want A Girl (Just Like The Girl That Married Dear Old Dad)" (1911), written in collaboration with Harry Von Tilzer. It can be heard in Show Business (1944) and The Jolson Story (1946). He was born in Cortland, New York and performed at some point in Vaudeville with his brothers John and Harry. He billed his own act as the "man of a thousand songs".

He quit vaudeville around 1912 after injuries suffered in a car accident. Dillon died in Ithaca, New York on February 10, 1966. He married in 1918 to Georgia Leola Head, daughter of George and Mary (Steen) Head.

Selected songs
"Every Little Bit Added to What You've Got Makes Just a Little Bit More" (1907, written with his brother Lawrence)
"I'd Rather Have a Girlie Than an Automobile" (1908)
"Keep Your Foot on the Soft Pedal" (1909)
"I Want A Girl (Just Like The Girl That Married Dear Old Dad)" (1911, with von Tilzer)
"All Alone" (1911, with Tilzer)
"That Girl of Mine" (1916, with Harry Tobias and Arthur Lange)
"I'll Wed the Girl I Left Behind" (1916)
"On the Old Back Seat of the Henry Ford" (1916, with Lawrence)
"My Grandfather's Girl" (1916)
"Take Me to My Alabam" (1916)
"Keep Right on to the End of the Road" (1924, with Harry Lauder) 
"Me and My Uncle Sam" (1941)

References

External links
Sheet music for "Take me to my Alabam': Come back, they're calling you", New York: M. Witmark & Sons, 1916, from the Alabama Sheet Music Collection

1877 births
1966 deaths
Songwriters from New York (state)
Vaudeville performers
People from Cortland, New York